BreakQuest is a multi-platform brick buster game created by Spanish studio Nurium Games, later ported to Mac OS by Red Marble Games. It was released on November 16, 2004, and was published by Stardock as part of TotalGaming.net.
PSP Minis version developed and published by Beatshapers released in Europe/Asia with PSP Go launch, October 1, 2009. It was later released in the North America region for PSP Go on March 18, 2010.

Plot
A huge corporation rules the world by making thousands of TV channels and shows for people to watch. Everyone becomes addicted, starting the destruction of human intelligence. The player has to put up a transmitter to stop the satellite signals and end the corporation's rule.

Gameplay
There are two modes of play: Arcade and Quest. Quest is basically a "campaign mode", where the levels are played in order, while in Arcade, the goal is to beat random levels as fast as possible. The game includes a physics engine. The engine enables all the objects in a level to interact with each other in a simulated physics environment.

Power-ups
BreakQuest features over 50 power-ups, referred to as Capsules by their pill-formed shape. These are casually released by the elimination of obstacles, but can also be granted at certain times, or simply spawn at the beginning of specific levels. Capsules can assist the player by providing weapons that help clear the levels faster, but may also increase the difficulty by changing the shape and behaviour of the ball and the bumper. Aside from the safety block and bonus ship Capsules, the player can also acquire reserve balls by collecting enough stars from star Capsules. If the only ball in play is lost, the reserve ball will launch automatically. However, the player is also given the choice to launch any number of reserve balls in-game at any time, with the penalty that a Ship will be lost if there are no balls or reserve balls left in play.

Levels
The 100 levels available in the game have each been designed with their own theme, realised with distinct sound and visual effects, also utilizing some features of the physics engine. Once a level has been completed, the player will be granted a Key to permanently unlock it on the level select screen. However, the collected Key will only apply for the specific difficulty mode that the player has chosen; hence a Key will have to be collected for each level in every difficulty mode, in order to make them available from the level select screen for each respective mode.

Gravitator
Another notable element in BreakQuest is the Gravitator, which can be used to attract any balls towards the bottom of the screen. With sufficient skill, it can be used to guide a ball towards a specific block. This alleviates the difficulty of hitting the last block in a level, a problem present in many breakout games.
Unfortunately, since Gravitator attracts toward the screen bottom, not the ship itself, it cannot be used to curve a ball traveling perfectly vertically, such as the initial shot at the beginning of every level.

Ports
The PlayStation mini version was developed and published by Beatshapers, features some modifications (according to developer's interview): levels are modified to fit PSP widescreen resolution, some levels are simplified to make a game playable because of performance issues. Also custom editable Arcade mode also has been removed, only preset modes (Beginner, Minimal, Fast, Armageddon, etc.) left in PlayStation version.

See also
  Breakout clone
 Arkanoid

References

 http://www.metacritic.com/game/psp/breakquest-extra-evolution

External links
Official BreakQuest website
Official TotalGaming.net page about BreakQuest

2004 video games
Beatshapers games
Breakout clones
MacOS games
PlayStation Network games
PlayStation Portable games
PlayStation Vita games
Single-player video games
Video games developed in Spain
Windows games
Red Marble Games games